St Michael's Church of England High School is a coeducational Church of England secondary school located in Rowley Regis, West Midlands, England. It was built during the 1960s and relocated from there to its current site on Curral Road in May 2011.

The school takes its name from St Michael's Church, situated some two miles away in the township of Langley.

Notable pupils include Carlton Palmer former English professional football player who played as a midfielder, most notably for Sheffield Wednesday.

It has been the only school in Rowley Regis since the closure of Britannia High School in 2002.

References

Secondary schools in Sandwell
Educational institutions established in the 1960s
Church of England secondary schools in the Diocese of Birmingham
Voluntary aided schools in England
Rowley Regis